"Can't Help Falling in Love" is a song recorded by American singer Elvis Presley for the album Blue Hawaii (1961). It was written by Hugo Peretti, Luigi Creatore, and George David Weiss and published by Gladys Music, Inc. The melody is based on "Plaisir d'amour", a popular French love song composed in 1784 by Jean-Paul-Égide Martini. The song was initially written from the perspective of a  woman as "Can't Help Falling in Love with Him", which explains the first and third line ending on "in" and "sin" rather than words rhyming with "you".

"Can't Help Falling in Love" was featured in Presley's 1961 film Blue Hawaii. It has also been recorded by many other artists, including Swedish pop group A-Teens, and the British reggae group UB40, whose 1993 version topped the US and UK charts. It was listed as one of the greatest songs by Rolling Stone, ranking #403 in the list's 2012 edition.

Background and release
Elvis Presley's version of the song topped the British charts in 1962, spending four weeks at no. 1. The single is certified Platinum by the RIAA, for US sales in excess of one million copies. In the United States, the song peaked at No. 2 on the US Billboard Hot 100 behind Joey Dee and the Starliters' "Peppermint Twist" and went to No. 1 on the Adult Contemporary chart for six weeks.

During Presley's late 1960s and 1970s live performances, the song was performed as the show's finale. Most notably, it was also sung in the live segment of his 1968 NBC television special, and as the closer for his 1973 Global telecast, Aloha from Hawaii. A version with a faster arrangement was the closing number in Presley's final TV special, Elvis in Concert. "Can't Help Falling in Love" was also the last song he performed live, at his concert in Indianapolis at Market Square Arena on 26 June 1977.

The recording appeared on the 1997 CD re-issue Elvis' Golden Records Volume 3 as a bonus track and on the 2002 career retrospective collection ELV1S: 30 No. 1 Hits.

In 2015, the song was included on the If I Can Dream album, on the occasion of the 80th anniversary of Presley's birth. The version uses archival voice recordings of Presley and his singers, backed by new orchestral arrangements performed by the Royal Philharmonic Orchestra.

The song is used as an anthem by several English football clubs since the 1960s, including Huddersfield Town, Hull City, Swindon Town and Sunderland.

According to a 2020 survey by OnBuy, the song is the most popular choice for couples as the song for the first dance at their wedding.

Track listings
7-inch single
 "I Can't Help Falling in Love With You"
 "Rock-A-Hula Baby"

Personnel
Credits sourced from AFM union contracts and label records.

 Elvis Presley – lead vocals
 The Jordanaires  – backing vocals
 Scotty Moore – electric guitar
 Hank Garland – acoustic guitar
 Floyd Cramer – piano
 Dudley Brooks – celesta
 Bob Moore – upright bass
 D. J. Fontana – drums
 Hal Blaine – percussion
 Alvino Rey – pedal steel guitar
 Boots Randolph – saxophone
 George Fields – harmonica
 Fred Tavares – ukulele

Charts

Weekly charts

Year-end charts

Certifications

UB40 version

In 1993, British reggae band UB40 covered the original 1961 Elvis Presley recording as the first single from their 1993 album, Promises and Lies. The song was released on May 10, 1993, and eventually climbed to No. 1 on the US Billboard Hot 100, staying there for seven weeks, becoming their 4th and last top 10 hit. It also topped the charts of 11 other countries, including Australia, Austria, the Netherlands, New Zealand (where it was the most successful single of 1993), and the United Kingdom where it topped the chart for 2 months.

The song appears on the soundtrack of the movie Sliver, the trailer for Fools Rush In, and an episode of Hindsight. In the US, and on the Sliver soundtrack, the song title was listed as "Can't Help Falling in Love," rather than what appeared on the record sleeve, which included parentheses around the words "I Can't Help". The single version of the song also has a slightly different backing rhythm and melody.

The song and band also appear in the 1997 film Speed 2: Cruise Control.

Critical reception
In his review, Rovi Staff from AllMusic noted that "carried by the hit "Can't Help Falling in Love", Promises and Lies finishes UB40's transition from a reggae band to an adult-contemporary band that plays reggae-pop." Another editor, David Jeffries said the song is "representing the ultra-slick, easy to swallow side of the band". Larry Flick from Billboard wrote, "U.K. dancehall stars indulge in Elvis Presley memories on this first single from the soundtrack to Sharon Stone's new movie, Sliver." He added that it "has a pillowy, midtempo pace that dabbles in island beats and radio-conscious funk. Brassy horns are a jolting, though ultimately pleasing, element in the arrangement. A fun respite from usual top 40 fare."

Marisa Fox from Entertainment Weekly said the song is "this album's equivalent" of their earlier version of Neil Diamond's "Red Red Wine", noting that the band "revitalize" it. She also noted that "they try some snappy new production tricks", like the "full-blown orchestrations" on the song, adding that "those kinds of enhancements only make the blend that much more infectious." In his weekly UK chart commentary, James Masterton wrote that "this was a hit almost before it had even been released." Pan-European magazine Music & Media viewed it as a "reggae remake that sounds like the sun will never stop shining." Alan Jones from Music Week described it as a "predictable ramble through the Elvis Presley/Andy Williams/Stylistics perennial". A reviewer from People Magazine called it a "Rasta-Lite" version.

Music video
A music video was produced to promote the single, directed by American filmmaker Neil Abramson. It was published on YouTube in June 2009. The video has amassed more than 61 million views as of September 2021.

Track listings

 7-inch single
 "I Can't Help Falling in Love with You" – 3:24
 "Jungle Love" – 5:09

 10-inch single
 "I Can't Help Falling in Love with You" (Extended Mix) – 6:03
 "Jungle Love" – 5:09
 "I Can't Help Falling in Love with You" – 3:24

 CD single
 "I Can't Help Falling in Love with You" – 3:24
 "Jungle Love" – 5:09

 CD maxi
 "I Can't Help Falling in Love with You" – 3:24
 "Jungle Love" – 5:09
 "I Can't Help Falling in Love with You" (Extended Mix) – 6:03

Charts

Weekly charts

Year-end charts

Decade-end charts

Certifications

A-Teens version

"Can't Help Falling in Love" was the A-Teens' first single from their third studio album, Pop 'til You Drop!, and is also included in the Lilo & Stitch movie soundtrack. The song has two music videos, one to promote the Disney movie, the other for the album. The song is also included in the teen pop compilation album Disney Girlz Rock and featured as a bonus track on the A-Teens' album New Arrival for the European market.

Charts

Music video
The video was directed by Gregory Dark and filmed in Los Angeles, California. There are two different versions. The "Disney Version", as the fans named it, features scenes from Lilo & Stitch, and also new scenes of the A-Teens with beach costumes. The "A-Teens Version" of the video, features the A-Teens on a white background with different close-ups and choreography, and scenes with puppies and different costumes.

Track listing
"Can't Help Falling in Love" (album version) – 3:06
"Hawaiian Roller Coaster Ride" – 3:27
 Performed by Mark Keali'i Ho'omalu and North Shore Children's Choir & Key Cygnetures
"He Mele, No Lilo" – 2:28
 Performed by Mark Keali'i Ho'omalu and North Shore Children's Choir & Key Cygnetures
 Included in only Australian and one of European releases

Other notable versions
An uptempo version by Andy Williams peaked at No. 3 in the UK Singles Chart in March 1970.
An Al Martino recording was released by Capitol Records and charted in 1970, peaking at No. 51 on the Billboard charts and No. 57 on the Cashbox chart.
The Stylistics went to No. 4 in the UK with a disco version in 1976.
Engelbert Humperdinck recorded the song in 1979 on his This Moment in Time LP. The single became an Adult Contemporary hit, reaching No. 44 in the US and No. 11 in Canada.
 Slim Whitman recorded the song in 1981 and it was included on his album Mr. Songman. This version peaked at No. 54 on the Billboard country charts, and was his last chart entry in his career.
Lick the Tins first released their version on a single in 1985 and included it on their 1986 album Blind Man on a Flying Horse. It peaked at no. 42 and spent nine weeks on the UK Singles Chart that year. It was also used in the movie Some Kind of Wonderful.
In 1986, Fleetwood Mac keyboardist and vocalist Christine McVie covered the song as part of the soundtrack for the movie A Fine Mess (film). 
In 1987, Corey Hart's recording reached No. 1 in Canada and No. 24 on the Billboard Hot 100.
Russell Watson reached No. 69 in the United Kingdom in a 2006 recording from his LP The Ultimate Collection.
A more recent German version, "Was Kann Mein Herz Dafür" by Claudia Jung was released in 2015 for her album, Seitensprung.
Haley Reinhart's 2015 remake of the song peaked at No. 17 on the Billboard Adult Contemporary chart and No. 31 on the Billboard Adult Pop Airplay chart. It was certified Platinum by the Recording Industry Association of America on October 4, 2019.
In 2018, Iliana Eve's remake was a single from the album Jazz (Deluxe) that hit No. 1 on the Billboard Jazz Charts. She was 15 years old when she recorded the song with Benny Reid.
A rendition sung by Kina Grannis appears in the 2018 film Crazy Rich Asians and the accompanying soundtrack. This rendition was certified Gold by RIAA in 2022.
Kacey Musgraves recorded a version of the song to feature in Elvis, a biographical film about Elvis Presley directed by Baz Luhrmann.

Covers 

 Guilherme Yohan - 2022

References

1961 songs
1961 singles
1976 singles
1986 singles
1987 singles
1993 singles
2002 singles
1960s ballads
Songs written by Hugo Peretti
Songs written by Luigi Creatore
Songs written by George David Weiss
Billboard Hot 100 number-one singles
Number-one singles in Australia
Number-one singles in Austria
Number-one singles in Belgium
RPM Top Singles number-one singles
Number-one singles in Denmark
European Hot 100 Singles number-one singles
Number-one singles in Finland
Number-one singles in Iceland
Dutch Top 40 number-one singles
Number-one singles in New Zealand
Number-one singles in South Africa
Number-one singles in Sweden
UK Singles Chart number-one singles
Music videos directed by Gregory Dark
Pop ballads
Soul ballads
Reggae fusion songs
Dance-pop songs
A-Teens songs
Andy Williams songs
Bob Dylan songs
Corey Hart (singer) songs
Elvis Presley songs
Christine McVie songs
The Stylistics songs
UB40 songs
Slim Whitman songs
Songs written for films
Walt Disney Records singles
RCA Victor singles
Virgin Records singles
Popular songs based on classical music